The Fighting Men is a 1950 Italian melodrama film directed by Camillo Mastrocinque and Roberto Savarese.

Plot summary

Cast 
Rossano Brazzi as Saro Costa
Charles Vanel as Don Salvatore Sparaino
Claudine Dupuis as Stellina Luparello
Milly Vitale as Elena Occhipinti
Eduardo Ciannelli as Barone Occhipinti
Turi Pandolfini
Ignazio Balsamo as Ciro Sollima
Carla Calò as Rosa

External links 

1950 films
1950 drama films
French drama films
Italian drama films
1950s Italian-language films
French black-and-white films
Lippert Pictures films
Films directed by Camillo Mastrocinque
Films directed by Roberto Savarese
Films scored by Enzo Masetti
Melodrama films
1950s Italian films
1950s French films